Fudbalski klub Radnik Bijeljina is a professional association football club based in the city of Bijeljina that is situated in northeast Bosnia and Herzegovina. The club plays its home matches on the Bijeljina City Stadium, which has a capacity of 6,000 seats. The name Radnik means worker.

The club won its first First League of the Republika Srpska title in the 1998–99 season, and the second in the 2004–05 season, after which the club got promoted to the Premier League of Bosnia and Herzegovina. The club was relegated from the Bosnian Premier League in the 2006–07 season.

Under the leadership of manager Darko Nestorović, in the 2011–12 season, Radnik once again won the title in the First League of RS and won a second promotion to the Premier League of Bosnia and Herzegovina, where they played until the 2021–22 season.

In the 2015–16 season, Radnik had, so far, their biggest success, winning its first national trophy, the Bosnia and Herzegovina Football Cup, after they beat FK Sloboda Tuzla in the two-legged cup final (1–1 in Bijeljina and 0–3 in Tuzla). Winning the cup, the club qualified to the 2016–17 UEFA Europa League qualifying rounds, its first UEFA competition.

History
The first football was brought to Bijeljina in 1916. The first football club was FK Podrinje which was formed in 1919. Later other clubs were formed such as FK Zora in 1920, FK Građanski in 1923, and FK Semberija in 1935. The clubs from this entire region of Posavlje and Podrinje played in the provincial leagues of the Belgrade Football Subassociation. After the end of World War II, FK Radnik was formed.

1945–1990
FK Radnik Bijeljina was founded on 14 June 1945. It didn't take long for Radnik to win their first trophy. In 1948 they became champions of the Tuzla District beating FK Sloboda Tuzla in the final. A year later, the club reached the 1/16 round of the Yugoslav Cup. In 1957, Radnik entered into the Novi Sad/Srem zone (regional league). In season 1971–72, Radnik became champions of the regional Republic League of Bosnia and Herzegovina and they entered a playoff for a place in the Yugoslav Second League. The club played FK Sloga from Vukovar in the playoff where it won both matches, 4–0 in Bijeljina and 8–0 in Vukovar. It entered the 2nd League of Yugoslavia playing against clubs such as FK Proleter Zrenjanin and FK Bečej. They stayed in the Yugoslav Second League for six seasons, being its best classification in the season 1977–78 when they finished 10th.

Another great achievement of FK Radnik Bijeljina was when the junior team won the Bosnia and Herzegovina Cup in 1987. In the semi-final, they beat FK Velež Mostar in Mostar by 5–2. In the final, Radnik beat FK Polet Bosanski Brod in the penalties to win the trophy.

1990s
From 1995 to 1997, the club was called FK Panteri Bijeljina and played under that name in the first two seasons of the First League of the Republika Srpska. In the 1998–99 season, Radnik Bijeljina won their first First League of RS title, an achievement reached again in the 2004–05 season.

2000s
In the season 2004–05, Radnik won their second Republika Srpska title which got them a place in the Premier League of Bosnia and Herzegovina for the 2005–06 season.  In the 2005–06 Premier League of Bosnia and Herzegovina season, Radnik finished 13th. A year earlier it had reached the 1/4 finals of the Bosnian Cup.  

In the Republika Srpska Cup, after being twice a losing finalist in the 2005–06 and 2008–09 editions, it finally won the Cup in the 2009–10 cup season.

2010s
Radnik won its first national trophy in 2016, winning the Bosnian Cup in the 2015–16 season, beating Sloboda Tuzla in the final (agg. 4–1). This way Radnik won a spot in the 2016–17 UEFA Europa League qualifying rounds. Even though they put up a good fight, Radnik got eliminated in the first qualifying round by Bulgarian First League club PFC Beroe Stara Zagora (agg. 2–0).

In the 2018–19 Bosnian Premier League season, Radnik finished on 5th place, but as 4th placed FK Željezničar Sarajevo didn't get an UEFA license to compete in that season's league, Radnik got qualified by default to the 2019–20 UEFA Europa League qualifying rounds. The club got eliminated by FC Spartak Trnava in the first qualifying round, after beating Spartak in the first match in Banja Luka 2–0, but it got eliminetd by Spartak in Trnava in the second match after penalties (2–3 on penalties for Spartak), since the Slovak side defeated Radnik 2–0 in regular time as well.

2020s
On 28 March 2020, five years after becoming club chairman of the board, Mladen Krstajić decided to leave Radnik, with Predrag Perković becoming the new club chairman.

In September 2022, fans waved a flag of the Totenkopf Division which is widely viewed as a hate symbol.

Honours

Domestic

League
First League of Republika Srpska:
 Winners (3): 1998–99, 2004–05, 2011–12
Bosnia and Herzegovina Republic League: 
Winners (2): 1948–49, 1971–72

Cups
Bosnia and Herzegovina Cup:
 Winners (1): 2015–16
Republika Srpska Cup:
 Winners (7): 2009–10, 2012–13, 2013–14, 2015–16, 2016–17, 2017–18, 2018–19 (record)
 Runners-up (3): 2006–07, 2008–09, 2010–11

European record

P = Matches played; W = Matches won; D = Matches drawn; L = Matches lost; GF = Goals for; GA = Goals against; GD = Goals difference. Defunct competitions indicated in italics.

List of matches

Players

Current squad

Players with multiple nationalities

  Bojan Burazor
  Milan Gavrić
  Nenad Rašević
  Stefan Spasojević
  Nenad Srećković

Club officials

Technical staff

Club management

Managerial history
 Ivan Mioč
 Radomir Jovičić
 Živorad Miražić
 Zoran Jagodić
 Miroslav Milanović
 Dušan Jevrić
 Nikola Bala
 Dragan Radović
 Darko Nestorović (July 1, 2011 – August 27, 2012)
 Srđan Bajić (September 1, 2012 – September 3, 2014)
 Slavko Petrović (September 5, 2014 – August 23, 2016)
 Nebojša Milošević (August 24, 2016 – May 9, 2017)
 Mladen Žižović (May 9, 2017 – November 11, 2019)
 Slobodan Starčević (November 11, 2019 – January 13, 2020)
 Slavko Petrović (January 13, 2020 – November 16, 2020)
 Darko Nestorović (November 24, 2020 – April 16, 2021)
 Vlado Jagodić (April 21, 2021 – October 25, 2021)
 Velibor Đurić (October 25, 2021 – present)

Club ranking

UEFA coefficient

2020–21 season

Source: uefa.com

Notes

References

External links

 

 
Football clubs in Bosnia and Herzegovina
Association football clubs established in 1945
Football clubs in Republika Srpska
Football clubs in Yugoslavia
Bijeljina
1945 establishments in Bosnia and Herzegovina